Ernest Etchi (born 4 June 1975) is a Cameroonian and a retired professional footballer who played as a centre-back.

He was a participant at the 1998 African Cup of Nations.

Etchi was born in Buéa, Cameroon on 4 June 1975.

References

 
 
 Profile at sitercl.com

1975 births
Living people
Association football central defenders
Cameroonian footballers
Cameroon international footballers
Coton Sport FC de Garoua players
RC Lens players
LB Châteauroux players
R. Charleroi S.C. players
Bnei Sakhnin F.C. players
F.C. Ashdod players
Bnei Yehuda Tel Aviv F.C. players
Hapoel Bnei Lod F.C. players
Ligue 1 players
Ligue 2 players
Israeli Premier League players
Liga Leumit players
1998 African Cup of Nations players
Cameroonian expatriate footballers
Expatriate footballers in France
Expatriate footballers in Belgium
Expatriate footballers in Israel
Cameroonian expatriate sportspeople in France
Cameroonian expatriate sportspeople in Belgium
Cameroonian expatriate sportspeople in Israel